The Social Transformation of American Medicine is a book written by Paul Starr and published by Basic Books in 1982. It won the 1984 Pulitzer Prize for General Non-Fiction as well as the Bancroft Prize.

Capers Jones wrote, "Paul Starr's book detailed the attempts of the American Medical Association to improve academic training of physicians, establish a canon of professional malpractice to weed out quacks, and to improve the professional status of physicians."

A second edition with a new epilogue by Starr was published in 2017.

References

External links

1982 non-fiction books
Pulitzer Prize for General Non-Fiction-winning works
Books about health care
Basic Books books
American Medical Association
Bancroft Prize-winning works